Hyaenodontinae ("hyena teeth") is a subfamily of extinct predatory hyaenodontid mammals from extinct family Hyaenodontidae. Fossil remains of these mammals are known from early Eocene to early Miocene deposits in Europe, Asia and North America.

Classification and phylogeny

Taxonomy
 Subfamily: †Hyaenodontinae 
 Genus: †Consobrinus 
 †Consobrinus quercy 
 Genus: †Propterodon (paraphyletic genus) 
 †Propterodon morrisi 
 †Propterodon paganensis 
 †Propterodon tongi 
 †Propterodon witteri 
 Tribe: †Epipterodontini 
 Genus: †Epipterodon 
 †Epipterodon hyaenoides 
 Genus: †Immanopterodon 
 †Immanopterodon acutidens 
 †Immanopterodon implacidus 
 Tribe: †Hyaenodontini 
 Genus: †Hyaenodon 
 †Hyaenodon brachyrhynchus 
 †Hyaenodon chunkhtensis 
 †Hyaenodon dubius 
 †Hyaenodon eminus 
 †Hyaenodon exiguus 
 †Hyaenodon filholi 
 †Hyaenodon gervaisi 
 †Hyaenodon heberti 
 †Hyaenodon leptorhynchus 
 †Hyaenodon minor 
 †Hyaenodon pervagus 
 †Hyaenodon pumilus 
 †Hyaenodon requieni 
 †Hyaenodon rossignoli 
 †Hyaenodon weilini 
 †Hyaenodon yuanchuensis 
 Subgenus: †Neohyaenodon (paraphyletic subgenus) 
 †Hyaenodon gigas 
 †Hyaenodon horridus 
 †Hyaenodon incertus 
 †Hyaenodon macrocephalus 
 †Hyaenodon megaloides 
 †Hyaenodon milvinus 
 †Hyaenodon mongoliensis 
 †Hyaenodon montanus 
 †Hyaenodon vetus 
 Subgenus: †Protohyaenodon (paraphyletic subgenus) 
 †Hyaenodon brevirostrus 
 †Hyaenodon crucians 
 †Hyaenodon microdon 
 †Hyaenodon mustelinus 
 †Hyaenodon raineyi 
 †Hyaenodon venturae

Phylogeny 
The phylogenetic relationships of subfamily Hyaenodontinae are shown in the following cladogram:

See also
 Mammal classification
 Hyaenodontidae

References

Hyaenodonts
Extinct mammals of Europe
Extinct mammals of Asia
Extinct mammals of North America
Mammal subfamilies